Elkhurst is an unincorporated community in Clay County, in the U.S. state of West Virginia.

History
The community derives its name from the nearby Elk River. A variant name was Yankee Dam. A post office called Yankee Dam was in operation between 1882 and 1910.

References

Unincorporated communities in Clay County, West Virginia
Unincorporated communities in West Virginia